Bembi may refer to: 
Belait language
Pagi language